List of presidents of the National Assembly of Togo.

Below is a list of office-holders:

References

Politics of Togo
Togo, National Assembly